Leopoldina Zanetti Borzino (1826–1902) was an Italian painter and printmaker.

Biography
Born Leopoldina Zanetti in Venice, Zanetti Borzino was the niece of Daniele Manin. She later moved to Genoa, where she married the painter Ulisse Borzino. She studied in Milan, and participated in numerous exhibitions there and in Genoa. She died in Milan.

Zanetti Borzino is represented in the collection of the National Gallery of Art with a lithograph. Other work is in the Gallery of Modern Art (GAM), Villa Saluzzo Serra, Nervi, Genoa.

References

1826 births
1902 deaths
Italian women painters
19th-century Italian painters
Italian printmakers
Women printmakers
19th-century printmakers
19th-century Italian women artists